Free RPG Day is an annual promotional event by the Tabletop role-playing game industry.  
The event rules are fairly simple: participating publishers provide special free copies of games to participating game stores; the game store agrees to provide one free game to any person who requests a free game on Free RPG Day.

History 
Shannon Appelcline discussed Kenzer & Company's comics "Crisis in Raimiton (2004), an "Adventure Guide to D&D" that Wizards gave away on Free Comic Book Day '04. It told the story of gamers playing D&D, and then the story of the characters they created. Wizards' interest in the free giveaway foreshadowed the industry's interest in a free giveaway day of their own: Free RPG Day." Appelcline noted that Impressions Advertising & Marketing's "most successful advertising program is one that continues today: Free RPG Day. Beginning in 2007, Impressions has every year coordinated the give-away of original RPG products in game stores across the country, resulting in considerable buzz and interest in those products — which is exactly what Impressions, an advertising and marketing company, was looking for.

Inspired by Free Comic Book Day, Free RPG Day was started in 2007.   The free RPG event was coordinated worldwide by Impressions, a game distributor, from 2007 to 2013.

Appelcline noted that "Goodman Games' last stand against the dying d20 market was Free RPG Day 2007. Where most companies were offering up a single product of variable quality, Goodman contributed three different books to Free RPG Day, each one of them a top-quality production." Paizo Publishing previewed the new GameMastery Modules series with D0: Hollow's Last Hope (2007), which showed up on June 23, 2007, at the first Free RPG Day. Flying Buffalo put together quick-start editions (2007, 2008, 2011) of Tunnels & Trolls for three of the Free RPG Days. Margaret Weis Productions put out the Castlemourn Cortex System Quickstart (2008) for the second Free RPG Day before closing down the line. Green Ronin's first new RPG, A Song of Ice and Fire Roleplaying (2009), had been previewed the previous year at Free RPG Day 2008.  From 2007-2011, Troll Lord Games issued a Castles & Crusades "quick start" at each Free RPG Day, to bring new players; science fiction game StarSIEGE: Event Horizon (2008) was also previewed at Free RPG Day 2008. Pinnacle Entertainment Group offered The Wild Hunt (2011) as a "Savage Worlds Test Drive" for Free RPG Day 2011.

Shannon Appelcline outlined that Columbia Games "produced adventures for two of the Free RPG Days: Field of Daisies (2008) and Dead Weight (2010). However, the latter product was more a teaser than anything. Stores only received one copy of the adventure when they purchased a box of Free RPG Day products; Columbia has since started selling the rest of the print run — and even admonished websites that reviewed Dead Weight as a "free" release. More recently they produced a map of Hârn (2012) for Free RPG Day 2012."

Related events 
Germany's first event was February 2, 2013; it included 9 games. The German version of Free RPG Day is called Gratisrollenspieltag, also known as Gratis Rollenspieltag.

Participation
The industry participants include the publishers of the participating games, the event organizer which coordinates delivery of the free product to the stores, and the brick-and-mortar store owners who agree to provide the free games to end users/gamers.  
Some publishers produce quick start adventures geared toward players unfamiliar with the game system or new to tabletop role-playing games in general. The games are distributed worldwide through participating stores.

The 1st annual Free RPG Day (June 23, 2007)
The first annual event in 2007 featured quick start adventures from 16 different publishers: 
 Call of Cthulhu (6th Edition) Quick Start 
 Castles & Crusades (SIEGE Engine system) Quick Start Rules
 Castles & Crusades gazetteer "Imperial Town of Tell Qa" // Wilderlands of High Fantasy setting
 Changeling: The Lost Free Rules and Adventure "Dwelling in Darkness"
 The Chronicles of Ramlar adventure "Black Arrow Run"
 D20 System 3.5 Edition (Game Mastery series) adventure D0: Hollow's Last Hope // 1st level, Golarion setting - The prequel to the "D" (Dungeon) series modules. 
 Vajra Enterprises In Dark Alleys adventure "Little Boy Lost"
 D20 System 3.5 Edition Bits of Magicka: Pocket Items - A list of twenty targets for pickpockets, plus the mundane or magical items they might be carrying. 
 Goodman Games Dungeon Crawl Classics / Dungeons & Dragons (3.5 Edition) adventure DCC #51.5: The Sinister Secret of Whiterock.
 Goodman Games Dungeons & Dragons (3.5 Edition) adventure "Wicked Fantasy Factory #0: Temple of Blood" // 1st level Wicked Fantasy Factory setting - A prequel to Wicked Fantasy Factory #1: Rumble in the Wizard’s Tower. The Wicked Fantasy Factory setting adds cinematic play rules to Dungeons & Dragons.   
 Mongoose RuneQuest (MRQ) adventure "Fisticuffs at O'Leary's Place" - A short adventure for use with Mongoose Publishing's licensed version of RuneQuest.
 Mutants & Masterminds Beginner's Guide
 Septimus Quickstart (D6 System (2nd Edition)) - A teaser for a Science Fiction roleplaying game that was supposed to premiere in 2008. It was later cancelled by West End Games. 
 Tunnels & Trolls solitaire adventure "Goblin Lake" 
 Warhammer Fantasy Roleplay adventure "The Pig, the Witch and Her Lover"
 Xcrawl "Xcrawl - Dungeonbattle Brooklyn" - An adventure set in the Xcrawl universe, in which adventurers are modern-day athletes (X-crawlers) competing in dungeon obstacle courses to win loot on a televised gameshow.

The 2nd annual Free RPG Day (June 21, 2008)
This event took place on June 21, 2008. The second annual event featured: 
 Castlemourn Quickstart
 Castles & Crusades (SIEGE Engine system) Quick Start Rules 2008 and adventure "Dwarven Glory" // Castle Zagyg setting 
 Cthulhu Live (3rd Edition) adventure "Murder at Miskatonic"
 D20 System 3.5 Edition (Game Mastery series) adventure D1.5: Revenge of the Kobold King // 5th level, Golarion setting - Sequel to D1: Crown of the Kobold King (2007).
 Dungeon Crawl Classics / Dungeons & Dragons (4th Edition) gazetteer "Punjar: The Tarnished Jewel" - details the decadent city of Punjar.
 Dungeons & Dragons (4th Edition) adventure "Treasure of Talon Pass".
 HârnMaster adventure "Field of Daisies".  
 Heirs to Olympia Quickstart Rules
 Hollow Earth Expedition Free RPG Day Quickstart Rules & Adventure 2008 "Stranded in the Hollow Earth"
 Hunter: The Vigil Free Rules and Adventure
 Iron Heroes RPG (2nd Edition) adventure "Bloodwood"
 A Song of Ice and Fire Roleplaying Quickstart Rules
 StarSIEGE: Event Horizon (SIEGE Engine system) Introductory Manual - Science-fiction and Cyberpunk roleplaying game.
 Trail of Cthulhu (GUMSHOE system) adventure "The Murderer of Thomas Fell"
 Traveller (Mongoose 1st Edition) Book 0: An Introduction to Traveller (Free RPG Day Quickstart Rules edition) - Mongoose Publishing's licensed update of GDW's Traveller. Uses Classic Traveller'''s 2D6 dice system. 
 Tunnels & Trolls 5.5 Edition GM adventure "Take the Money"

The 3rd annual Free RPG Day (June 20, 2009)
Games included in the third Free RPG Day event were: 
 Pathfinder RPG "Bonus Bestiary"
 Paranoia RPG "A Citizen's Guide to Surviving Alpha Complex"
 Dragon Warriors Introductory Book
 Rogue Trader RPG (Warhammer 40,000 roleplaying game) Quick Start Rules and adventure "Forsaken Bounty"
 Geist: The Sin-Eaters Free Quickstart Rules and adventure "The Return of Mr. Monster"
 Corporation RPG adventure "Grab the Cache"
 Hollow Earth Expedition Free RPG Day Quickstart Rules & Adventure 2009 "Kidnapped in the Hollow Earth."
 Dungeons & Dragons (4th Edition) adventures "Immortal Heroes" / "Hearts of Chaos"
 Dungeons & Dragons (4th Edition) "Khyber's Harvest"
 Sword and Sorcery Studios Free RPG Day 2009: PDF Adjunct  
 Generic map set "The Ice Temple" (PDF)
 Arcana Evolved / Dungeons & Dragons (3.5 Edition); Lands of the Diamond Throne setting: magical items supplement "Items Evolved: Rituals" (PDF) 
 Arcana Evolved: bestiary supplement "Mythical Monstrosities" (PDF)
 Dungeons & Dragons (4th Edition); Feudal Lords setting: 9th level adventure "Oracle of Orcas" (PDF)

The 4th annual Free RPG Day (June 19, 2010)
This event took place on June 19, 2010.
 Call of Cthulhu (6th Edition) adventure "Abomination of the Amazon"
 Castles & Crusades 2010 Quick Start Rules
 Deathwatch RPG (Warhammer 40,000 roleplaying game) adventure "Final Sanction" (Sequence 1) - Things are not right on the planet of Landsholm... Dungeons & Dragons "Bloodsand Arena"
 Exalted (2nd Edition) basic rules and adventure "Under the Rose"
 HârnMaster (3rd Edition) basic rules and adventure "Dead Weight"
 Heroes Forever Free RPG Day Package - Shrinkwrapped package containing two  booklets: a superhero miniatures rulebook and a basic adventure booklet "The Shelter". 
 Hollow Earth Expedition Free RPG Day Adventure 2010: "A Nightmare at the Museum." (Ubiquity RPG Quickstart Rules)
 Legend of the Five Rings RPG adventure "Legacy of Disaster"
 Pathfinder adventure "Master of the Fallen Fortress" (1st level: Absalom)
 Prime Directive (Star Trek roleplaying game) adventure "The Dread Pirate Aldo" (both D20 Modern (Prime Directive D20 Modern) and GURPS (4th Edition) (GURPS Prime Directive) rules)
 Roll d-Infinity magazine (Issue #0: The Shape of Things to Come) - Sample issue of a new multi-platform role-playing game magazine.

The 5th annual Free RPG Day (June 18, 2011)
 Dice Tower
 Commemorative Dice For Store Owner
 Unique Elven-themed Dice
 All Flesh Must Be Eaten (Unisystem) Quickstart & Adventure
 Arcanis RPG Quickstart & Adventure
 Aspect Quickstart Adventure
 Black Crusade RPG (Warhammer 40,000 roleplaying game) Quickstart and Adventure 
 Castles & Crusades Quickstart and Adventure
 Settlers of Catan: Catanimal Variant rules -  single page paper insert
 Dungeon Crawl Classics RPG Quickstart
 Dungeons & Dragons (4th Edition) "Domain of Dread: Histhaven" - Supplement to the box set "The Shadowfell: Gloomwrought and Beyond"
 DragonAge Quickstart
 Hollow Earth Expedition Free RPG Day Quickstart Rules & Adventure 2011 "Trapped in the Aircraft Graveyard."
 Pathfinder RPG adventure "We Be Goblins!"
 Prime Directive (Star Trek roleplaying game) adventure "Starship Aldo" (both d20 Modern & GURPS)
 Savage Worlds Quickstart & Adventure "The Wild Hunt"
 Stellar Horizons Quickstart
 Tunnels & Trolls solitaire adventure "Rescue Mission" and GM adventure "Riverboat Adventure"
 World of Darkness Quickstart
 X-treme Dungeon Mastery (XD20 System) campaign setting "Laser Squid Nemesis" - A setting in which the characters are sentient sealife who live in a modern technological aquatic world "with undersea cars, phones, and... well, lasers!"''

The 6th annual Free RPG Day (June 16, 2012)
Games included in the sixth Free RPG Day event were:

 Catalyst Game Labs BattleTech: A Time of War (1st Edition) / Shadowrun (5th Edition) Quick-Start Rules Flipbook (Battletech: A Time of War on one side, Shadowrun on the other side)
 Brass & Steel: A Game of Steampunk Adventure LARP Quick-Start Rules and adventure "The Case of the Croquet Mallet" 
 Conspiracy X Introductory Game Kit and adventure "Convoy"
 Cosmic Patrol Roleplaying Game Quick-Start Rules and adventure "The Kahn Protocol"
 Pathfinder Roleplaying Game adventure "Dawn of the Scarlet Sun"
 Dungeons & Dragons (4th Edition) adventure "Dead in the Eye"
 Dungeon Crawl Classics Free RPG Day 2012 adventures "The Jeweller That Dealt In Stardust" and "The Undulating Corruption"
 Hârnmaster Hârn Setting Material with World Map
 Castles & Crusades adventure "In Search of Adventure"
 Pathfinder Roleplaying Game adventure "Shadowsfall: The Temple of Orcus"
 Pathfinder Roleplaying Game adventure "Slavers of the Sunken Garden"
 Pathfinder Roleplaying Game adventure "Undying Legacy of the First Ones"

The 7th annual Free RPG Day (June 15, 2013)
This event took place on June 15, 2013.
 Catalyst Game Labs BattleTech: A Time of War (1st Edition) / Shadowrun (5th Edition) Quick-Start Rules Flipbook (Battletech: A Time of War on one side, Shadowrun on the other side)
 Lamentations of the Flame Princess (3rd Edition) adventure "Better than Any Man" (Rated Ages 18+)
 Cosmic Patrol Roleplaying Game Quick-Start Rules and adventure "The Eiger Agenda"
 Deluxe Tunnels & Trolls Preview Pack  
 Dungeon Crawl Classics rules ("The Imperishable Sorceress") / Maximum X-Crawl ("Studio City Xcrawl")  
 Swords & Wizardry adventure "Hall of Bones" 
 Castles & Crusades adventure "A Pot of Broken Bones (& Halfling Broth)" 
 Vampire: The Requiem adventure "Reap the Whirlwind"
 Star Wars Roleplaying Game: Edge of the Empire Basic Rules and adventure "Under a Black Sun" 
 Pathfinder Roleplaying Game adventure "Temple of the Forbidden God" 
 Pathfinder Roleplaying Game adventure "We Be Goblins Too!" - Sequel to the 2011 adventure "We be Goblins"

The 8th annual Free RPG Day (June 21, 2014) 
This event took place on June 21, 2014. Games included in the 8th annual event were:

 Catalyst Game Labs BattleTech: A Time of War (1st Edition) / Shadowrun (5th Edition) Quick-Start Rules Flipbook (Battletech: A Time of War  adventure "Character Assassination" on one side, Shadowrun adventure "Spoiled Rotten" on the other side)
 Cosmic Patrol Roleplaying Game Quick-Start Rules and adventure "The Continuance Contingency"
 Lamentations of the Flame Princess adventure "The Doom Cave of the Crystal-Headed Children"
 Castles & Crusades adventure "A Druid's Lament"
 The Godsfall RPG Demo
 Goodman Games Free RPG Day 2014 Dungeon Crawl Classics adventure "Elzemon and the Blood-Drinking Box" and Maximum XCrawl adventure "Dungeon Detonation"
 Mage: The Ascension Introductory Quickstart Rules and Adventure Hooks
 13th Age adventure "Make Your Own Luck" - Prequel to Eyes of the Stone Thief campaign
 Pathfinder Roleplaying Game adventure "Risen from the Sands"
 Time Travel Dinosaur: Mesozoic Mayhem
 Valiant Universe RPG Quick Start Rules: Experience the Harbinger Wars

The 9th annual Free RPG Day (June 20, 2015) 
This event took place on June 20, 2015. Products included in the 9th annual event were:

 Pelgrane Press flipbook 13th Age adventure "At Land's Edge" / Night's Black Agents adventure "The Harker Intrusion"
 Catalyst Game Labs BattleTech: A Time of War (1st Edition) / Shadowrun (5th Edition) Quick-Start Rules Flipbook (Battletech: A Time of War on one side, Shadowrun on the other side)
 Cosmic Patrol Roleplaying Game Quick-Start Rules and adventure "The Doomsday Protocols"
 Dungeon Crawl Classics Judge's Screen
 Hellas Free RPG Day Quickstart
 Goodman Games Fifth Edition Fantasy adventure "Into the Dragon's Maw"
 Pathfinder Roleplaying Game Player Character SoundSets (giftcard with codes for sound effect packs from Syrinscape)
 Atlantis: The Second Age Quick-Start Rules and adventure "Prelude to Adventure"
 Through the Breach Quick-Start Rules and adventure "Recruitment Drive"
 Castles & Crusades adventure "Shadows of a Green Sky"
 Valiant Universe RPG Quick Start Rules: Experience the Rumble in the Bay
 Pathfinder Roleplaying Game adventure "We Be Goblins Free!"
 Kobolds Ate My Baby! Quick-Start Rules and adventure "You Iz Kobolds?!"

References

External links
 Free RPG Day

Recurring events established in 2007
Role-playing games